Xiaomi Corporation, commonly known as Xiaomi and registered as Xiaomi Inc., is a Chinese designer and manufacturer of consumer electronics and related software, home appliances, and household items. Behind Samsung, it is the second largest manufacturer of smartphones in the world, most of which run on the MIUI User interface,  which is based on the Android operating system, The company is ranked 338th and is the youngest company on the Fortune Global 500.

Xiaomi was founded in 2010 in Beijing by now multi-billionaire Lei Jun when he was 40 years old, along with six senior associates. Lei had founded Kingsoft as well as Joyo.com, which he sold to Amazon for $75 million in 2004. In August 2011, Xiaomi released its first smartphone and, by 2014, it had the largest market share of smartphones sold in China. Initially the company only sold its products online; however, it later opened brick and mortar stores. By 2015, it was developing a wide range of consumer electronics. In 2020, the company sold 146.3 million smartphones and its MIUI mobile user interface has over 500 million monthly active users.  As of 2023, Xiaomi is the third-largest seller of smartphones worldwide, with a market share of about 12%, according to Counterpoint. It also is a major manufacturer of appliances including televisions, flashlights, unmanned aerial vehicles, and air purifiers using its Internet of Things and Xiaomi Smart Home product ecosystems.

Xiaomi keeps its prices close to its manufacturing costs and bill of materials costs by keeping most of its products in the market for 18 months, longer than most smartphone companies, The company also uses inventory optimization and flash sales to keep its inventory low.

History

2010–2013
On 6 April 2010 Xiaomi was co-founded by Lei Jun and six others:

 Lin Bin, vice president of the Google China Institute of Engineering
 Zhou Guangping, senior director of the Motorola Beijing R&D center 
 Liu De, department chair of the Department of Industrial Design at the University of Science and Technology Beijing 
 Li Wanqiang, general manager of Kingsoft Dictionary 
 Huang Jiangji, principal development manager 
 Hong Feng, senior product manager for Google China

Lei had founded Kingsoft as well as Joyo.com, which he sold to Amazon for $75 million in 2004. At the time of the founding of the company, Lei was dissatisfied with the products of other mobile phone manufacturers and thought he could make a better product.

On 16 August 2010, Xiaomi launched its first Android-based firmware MIUI.

In 2010, the company raised $41 million in a Series A round.

In August 2011, the company launched its first phone, the Xiaomi Mi1. The device had Xiaomi's MIUI firmware along with Android installation.

In December 2011, the company raised $90 million in a Series B round.

In June 2012, the company raised $216 million of funding in a Series C round at a $4 billion valuation. Institutional investors participating in the first round of funding included Temasek Holdings, IDG Capital, Qiming Venture Partners and Qualcomm.

In August 2013, the company hired Hugo Barra from Google, where he served as vice president of product management for the Android platform. He was employed as vice president of Xiaomi to expand the company outside of mainland China, making Xiaomi the first company selling smartphones to poach a senior staffer from Google's Android team. He left the company in February 2017.

In September 2013, Xiaomi announced its Xiaomi Mi3 smartphone and an Android-based 47-inch 3D-capable Smart TV assembled by Sony TV manufacturer Wistron Corporation of Taiwan.

In October 2013, it became the fifth-most-used smartphone brand in China.

In 2013, Xiaomi sold 18.7 million smartphones.

2014–2017
In February 2014, Xiaomi announced its expansion outside China, with an international headquarters in Singapore.

In April 2014, Xiaomi purchased the domain name mi.com for a record , the most expensive domain name ever bought in China, replacing xiaomi.com as the company's main domain name.

In September 2014, Xiaomi acquired a 24.7% some part taken in Roborock.

In December 2014, Xiaomi raised US$1.1 billion at a valuation of over US$45 billion, making it one of the most valuable private technology companies in the world. The financing round was led by Hong Kong-based technology fund All-Stars Investment Limited, a fund run by former Morgan Stanley analyst Richard Ji.

In 2014, the company sold over 60 million smartphones. In 2014, 94% of the company's revenue came from mobile phone sales.

In April 2015, Ratan Tata acquired a stake in Xiaomi.

On 30 June 2015, Xiaomi announced its expansion into Brazil with the launch of locally manufactured Redmi 2; it was the first time the company assembled a smartphone outside of China. 
However, the company left Brazil in the second half of 2016.

On 26 February 2016, Xiaomi launched the Mi5, powered by the Qualcomm Snapdragon 820 processor.

On 3 March 2016, Xiaomi launched the Redmi Note 3 Pro in India, the first smartphone to powered by a Qualcomm Snapdragon 650 processor.

On 10 May 2016, Xiaomi launched the Mi Max, powered by the Qualcomm Snapdragon 650/652 processor.

In June 2016, the company acquired patents from Microsoft.

In September 2016, Xiaomi launched sales in the European Union through a partnership with ABC Data.

Also in September 2016, the Xiaomi Mi Robot vacuum was released by Roborock.

On 26 October 2016, Xiaomi launched the Mi Mix, powered by the Qualcomm Snapdragon 821 processor.

On 22 March 2017, Xiaomi announced that it planned to set up a second manufacturing unit in India in partnership with contract manufacturer Foxconn.

On 19 April 2017, Xiaomi launched the Mi6, powered by the Qualcomm Snapdragon 835 processor.

In July 2017, the company entered into a patent licensing agreement with Nokia.

On 5 September 2017, Xiaomi released Xiaomi Mi A1, the first Android One smartphone under the slogan: Created by Xiaomi, Powered by Google. Xiaomi stated started working with Google for the Mi A1 Android One smartphone earlier in 2017. An alternate version of the phone was also available with MIUI, the MI 5X.

In 2017, Xiaomi opened Mi Stores in India, Pakistan and Bangladesh. The EU's first Mi Store was opened in Athens, Greece in October 2017. In Q3 2017, Xiaomi overtook Samsung to become the largest smartphone brand in India. Xiaomi sold 9.2 million units during the quarter. On 7 November 2017, Xiaomi commenced sales in Spain and Western Europe.

2018–present

In April 2018, Xiaomi announced a smartphone gaming brand called Black Shark. It had 6GB of RAM coupled with Snapdragon 845 SoC, and was priced at $508, which was cheaper than its competitors.

On 2 May 2018, Xiaomi announced the launch of Mi Music and Mi Video to offer "value-added internet services" in India. On 3 May 2018, Xiaomi announced a partnership with 3 to sell smartphones in the United Kingdom, Ireland, Austria, Denmark, and Sweden

In May 2018, Xiaomi began selling smart home products in the United States through Amazon.

In June 2018, Xiaomi became a public company via an initial public offering on the Hong Kong Stock Exchange, raising $4.72 billion.

On 7 August 2018, Xiaomi announced that Holitech Technology Co. Ltd., Xiaomi's top supplier, would invest up to $200 million over the next three years to set up a major new plant in India.

In August 2018, the company announced POCO as a mid-range smartphone line, first launching in India.

In Q4 of 2018, the Xiaomi Poco F1 became the best selling smartphone sold online in India. The Pocophone was sometimes referred to as the "flagship killer" for offering high-end specifications at an affordable price.

In October 2019, the company announced that it would launch more than 10 5G phones in 2020, including the Mi 10/10 Pro with 5G functionality.

On 17 January 2020, Poco became a separate sub-brand of Xiaomi with entry-level and mid-range devices.

In March 2020, Xiaomi showcased its new 40W wireless charging solution, which was able to fully charge a smartphone with a 4,000mAh battery from flat in 40 minutes.

In October 2020, Xiaomi became the third largest smartphone maker in the world by shipment volume, shipping 46.2 million handsets in Q3 2020.

On 30 March 2021, Xiaomi announced that it will invest US$10 billion in electric vehicles over the following ten years. On 31 March 2021, Xiaomi announced a new logo for the company, designed by Kenya Hara.

In July 2021, Xiaomi became the second largest smartphone maker in the world, according to Canalys.  It also surpassed Apple for the first time in Europe, making it the second largest in Europe according to Counterpoint.

In August 2021, the company acquired autonomous driving company Deepmotion for $77 million.

Innovation and development
In the 2021 review of WIPO's annual World Intellectual Property Indicators Xiaomi was ranked as 2nd in the world, with 216 designs in industrial design registrations being published under the Hague System during 2020. This position is up on their previous 3rd place ranking in 2019 for 111 industrial design registrations being published.

On 8 February 2022, Lei released a statement on Weibo to announce plans for Xiaomi to enter the high-end smartphone market and surpass Apple as the top seller of premium smartphones in China in three years. To achieve that goal, Xiaomi will invest US$15.7 billion in R&D over the next five years, and the company will benchmark its products and user experience against Apple’s product lines. Lei described the new strategy as a "life-or-death battle for our development" in his Weibo post, after Xiaomi's market share in China contracted over consecutive quarters, from 17% to 14% between Q2 and Q3 2021, dipping further to 13.2% as of Q4 2021.

According to a recent report by Canalys, Xiaomi leads Indian smartphone sales in Q1. Xiaomi is one of the leaders of the smartphone makers in India which maintains device affordability.

In 2022, Xiaomi announced and debuted the company's humanoid robot prototype to the public, while the current state of the robot is very limited in its abilities, the announcement was made to mark the companies ambitions to integrate AI into its product designs as well as develop their humanoid robot project into the future.

Partnerships

Xiaomi and Harman Kardon
In 2021, Harman Kardon has collaborated with Xiaomi for its newest smartphones, the Xiaomi Mi 11 series are the first smartphones to feature with Harman Kardon-tuned dual speaker setup.

Xiaomi and Leica

In 2022, Leica Camera entered a strategic partnership with Xiaomi to jointly develop Leica cameras to be used in Xiaomi flagship smartphones, succeeding the partnership between Huawei and Leica. The first flagship smartphones under this new partnership were the Xiaomi 12S Ultra and Xiaomi MIX Fold 2, launched in July and August 2022, respectively.

Xiaomi Studios
In 2021, Xiaomi began collaborating with directors to create short films shot entirely using the Xiaomi Mi 11 line of phones. In 2022, they made two shorts with Jessica Henwick. The first, Bus Girl won several awards and was long listed for Best British Short at the 2023 BAFTA Awards.

Corporate identity

Name etymology 
Xiaomi is the Chinese word for "millet". In 2011 its CEO Lei Jun suggested there are more meanings than just the "millet and rice". He linked the "Xiao" part to the Buddhist concept that "a single grain of rice of a Buddhist is as great as a mountain", suggesting that Xiaomi wants to work from the little things, instead of starting by striving for perfection, while "mi" is an acronym for Mobile Internet and also "mission impossible", referring to the obstacles encountered in starting the company. He also stated that he thinks the name is cute. In 2012 Lei Jun said that the name is about revolution and being able to bring innovation into a new area. Xiaomi's new "Rifle" processor has given weight to several sources linking the latter meaning to the Communist Party of China's "millet and rifle" (小米加步枪) revolutionary idiom during the Second Sino-Japanese War.

Logo and mascot

Xiaomi's first logo consisted of a single orange square with the letters "MI" in white located in the center of the square. This logo was in use until 31 March 2021, when a new logo, designed by well-known Japanese designer Kenya Hara, replaced the old one, consisting of the same basic structure as the previous logo, but the square was replaced with a "squircle" with rounded corners instead, with the letters "MI" remaining identical to the previous logo, along with a slightly darker hue.

Xiaomi's mascot, Mitu, is a white rabbit wearing an Ushanka (known locally as a "Lei Feng hat" in China) with a red star and a red scarf around its neck. Later red star on hat was replaced by company's logo.

Reception

Imitation of Apple Inc.
Xiaomi has been accused of imitating Apple Inc. The hunger marketing strategy of Xiaomi was described as riding on the back of the "cult of Apple".

After reading a book about Steve Jobs in college, Xiaomi's chairman and CEO, Lei Jun, carefully cultivated a Steve Jobs image, including jeans, dark shirts, and Jobs' announcement style at Xiaomi's earlier product announcements. He was characterized as a "counterfeit Jobs."

In 2013, critics debated how much of Xiaomi's products were innovative, and how much of their innovation was just really good public relations.

Others point out that while there are similarities to Apple, the ability to customize the software based upon user preferences through the use of Google's Android operating system sets Xiaomi apart. Xiaomi has also developed a much wider range of consumer products than Apple.

Violation of GNU General Public License
In January 2018, Xiaomi was criticized for its non-compliance with the terms of the GNU General Public License. The Android project's Linux kernel is licensed under the copyleft terms of the GPL, which requires Xiaomi to distribute the complete source code of the Android kernel and device trees for every Android device it distributes. By refusing to do so, or by unreasonably delaying these releases, Xiaomi is operating in violation of intellectual property law in China, as a WIPO state. Prominent Android developer Francisco Franco publicly criticized Xiaomi's behaviour after repeated delays in the release of kernel source code. Xiaomi in 2013 said that it would release the kernel code. The kernel source code was available on the GitHub website in 2020.

Privacy concerns and data collection
As a company based in China, Xiaomi is obligated to share data with the Chinese government under the China Internet Security Law and National Intelligence Law. There were reports that Xiaomi's Cloud messaging service sends some private data, including call logs and contact information, to Xiaomi servers. Xiaomi later released an MIUI update that made cloud messaging optional and that no private data was sent to Xiaomi servers if the cloud messaging service was turned off.

On 23 October 2014, Xiaomi announced that it was setting up servers outside of China for international users, citing improved services and compliance to regulations in several countries.

On 19 October 2014, the Indian Air Force issued a warning against Xiaomi phones, stating that they were a national threat as they sent user data to an agency of the Chinese government.

In April 2019, researchers at Check Point found a security breach in Xiaomi phone apps. The security flaw was reported to be preinstalled.

On 30 April 2020, Forbes reported that Xiaomi extensively tracks use of its browsers, including private browser activity, phone metadata and device navigation, and more alarmingly, without secure encryption or anonymization, more invasively and to a greater extent than mainstream browsers. Xiaomi disputed the claims, while confirming that it did extensively collect browsing data, and saying that the data was not linked to any individuals and that users had consented to being tracked. Xiaomi posted a response stating that the collection of aggregated usage statistics data is used for internal analysis, and would not link any personally identifiable information to any of this data. However, after a followup by Gabriel Cirlig, the writer of the report, Xiaomi added an option to completely stop the information leak when using its browser in incognito mode.

Censorship
In September 2021, amidst a political spat between China and Lithuania, the Lithuanian Ministry of National Defence urged people to dispose the Chinese-made mobile phones and avoid buying new ones, after the National Cyber Security Centre of Lithuania claimed that Xiaomi devices have built-in censorship capabilities that can be turned on remotely.

Xiaomi denied the accusations, saying that it "does not censor communications to or from its users", and that they would be engaging a third-party to assess the allegations. They also stated that regarding data privacy, it was compliant with two frameworks for following Europe's General Data Protection Regulation (GDPR), namely its ISO/IEC 27001 Information Security Management Standards and the ISO/IEC 27701 Privacy Information Management System.

Legal actions

State administration of radio, film and television issue 
In November 2012, Xiaomi's smart set-top box stopped working one week after the launch due to the company having run foul of China's State Administration of Radio, Film, and Television. The regulatory issues were overcome in January 2013.

Misleading sales figures
The Taiwanese Fair Trade Commission investigated the flash sales and found that Xiaomi had sold fewer smartphones than advertised. Xiaomi claimed that the number of smartphones sold was 10,000 units each for the first two flash sales, and 8,000 units for the third one. However, FTC investigated the claims and found that Xiaomi sold 9,339 devices in the first flash sale, 9,492 units in the second one, and 7,389 for the third. It was found that during the first flash sale, Xiaomi had given 1,750 priority ‘F-codes’ to people who could place their orders without having to go through the flash sale, thus diminishing the stock that was publicly available. The FTC fined Xiaomi .

Shut down of Australia store
In March 2014, Xiaomi Store Australia (an unrelated business) began selling Xiaomi mobile phones online in Australia through its website, XiaomiStore.com.au. However, Xiaomi soon "requested" that the store be shut down by 25 July 2014. On 7 August 2014, shortly after sales were halted, the website was taken down. An industry commentator described the action by Xiaomi to get the Australian website closed down as unprecedented, saying, "I’ve never come across this [before]. It would have to be a strategic move." At the time this left only one online vendor selling Xiaomi mobile phones into Australia, namely Yatango (formerly MobiCity), which was based in Hong Kong. This business closed in late 2015.

Temporary ban in India due to patent infringement
On 9 December 2014, the High Court of Delhi granted an ex parte injunction that banned the import and sale of Xiaomi products in India. The injunction was issued in response to a complaint filed by Ericsson in connection with the infringement of its patent licensed under fair, reasonable, and non-discriminatory licensing. The injunction was applicable until 5 February 2015, the date on which the High Court was scheduled to summon both parties for a formal hearing of the case. On 16 December, the High Court granted permission to Xiaomi to sell its devices running on a Qualcomm-based processor until 8 January 2015. Xiaomi then held various sales on Flipkart, including one on 30 December 2014. Its flagship Xiaomi Redmi Note 4G phone sold out in six seconds. A judge extended the division bench's interim order, allowing Xiaomi to continue the sale of Qualcomm chipset-based handsets until March 2018.

U.S. sanctions due to ties with People's Liberation Army
In January 2021, the United States government named Xiaomi as a company "owned or controlled" by the People's Liberation Army and thereby prohibited any American company or individual from investing in it. However, the investment ban was blocked by a US court ruling after Xiaomi filed a lawsuit in the United States District Court for the District of Columbia, with the court expressing skepticism regarding the government's national security concerns. Xiaomi denied the allegations of military ties and stated that its products and services were of civilian and commercial use. In May 2021, Xiaomi reached an agreement with the Defense Department to remove the designation of the company as military-linked.

Lawsuit by KPN alleging patent infringement
On 19 January 2021, KPN, a Dutch landline and mobile telecommunications company, sued Xiaomi and others for patent infringement. KPN filed similar lawsuits against Samsung in 2014 and 2015 in a court in the US.

Lawsuit by Wyze alleging invalid patent
In July 2021, Xiaomi submitted a report to Amazon alleging that Wyze Labs had infringed upon its 2019 "Autonomous Cleaning Device and Wind Path Structure of Same" robot vacuum patent. On 15 July 2021, Wyze filed a lawsuit against Xiaomi in the U.S. District Court for the Western District of Washington, arguing that prior art exists and asking the court for a declaratory judgment that Xiaomi's 2019 robot vacuum patent is invalid.

Asset seizure in India 
In April 2022, India's Enforcement Directorate seized assets from Xiaomi as part of an investigation into violations of foreign exchange laws. The asset seizure was subsequently put on hold by a court order, but later upheld.

Overseas Manufacturing

Inauguration Plant in Pakistan  
Xiaomi’s mobile device manufacturing plant was inaugurated on March 4 2022 to begin production in Pakistan. The plant was set up in conjunction with Select Technologies (Pvt) Limited, an Air Link fully owned subsidiary. The production plant is located in Lahore.

As of July 2022, the future of the plant is uncertain due to the 2021–2022 global supply chain crisis.

References

External links

 
 
 

 
2018 initial public offerings
Chinese brands
Chinese companies established in 2010
Companies listed on the Hong Kong Stock Exchange
Computer hardware companies
Electronics companies established in 2010
Electronics companies of China
Home automation companies
Manufacturing companies established in 2010
Mobile phone companies of China
Mobile phone manufacturers
Multinational companies headquartered in China
Networking hardware companies